Wilbur Byrne "Wee Willie" Wilkin (April 20, 1916 – May 16, 1973) was an American football offensive tackle in the National Football League (NFL) for the Washington Redskins.  Wilkin also played in the All-America Football Conference (AAFC) for the Chicago Rockets.  He attended St. Mary's College of California.

Early life
Born in Bingham Canyon, Utah, Wilkin attended Springville High School, where he played football, basketball, and track and field.

College career
Wilkin played college football at Saint Mary's College in Moraga, California, graduating in 1938.  He was inducted into the Gaels' Athletic Hall of Fame in 1973.  After college, Wilkin briefly worked in a silver mine in Mexico.

NFL
Wilkin signed with the Washington Redskins of the National Football League in 1938, and played through 1943.  During that span, he played in three NFL Championship games, winning the 1942 NFL Championship Game.  He also scored the only touchdown of his career in 1942, off of a blocked punt in a win over the Cleveland Rams.

Military career
After the 1943 season, Wilkin entered the United States Marine Corps during World War II.  While in service, he was stationed at Marine Corps Air Station El Toro in southern California and played for their football team.

AAFC
After his service with the Marines ended, Wilkin signed with the Chicago Rockets of the All-America Football Conference in 1946.

Teaching and coaching
After retiring from football, Wilkin became a math and social studies high school teacher for special needs children in Monterey County, California, and was an offensive line coach for Monterey High School.  He later taught in Deer Lodge, Montana.

Personal
Wilkin was married and had twin sons, John Sharpe Wilkin and Christopher Wilkin; both died at age 22 in the same 1965 automobile accident near Truckee, California. In 1970, Wilkin had a brain tumor successfully removed.  However, two years later, he developed stomach cancer, and died at age 57 in 1973 in Palo Alto, California.

References

External links
 

1916 births
1973 deaths
American football offensive tackles
Chicago Rockets players
People from Bingham Canyon, Utah
Players of American football from Utah
Washington Redskins players
Saint Mary's Gaels football players
People from Deer Lodge, Montana
United States Marine Corps personnel of World War II
Deaths from stomach cancer
Deaths from cancer in California